This is an all-time list of streetcar (tram), interurban and light rail systems in the United States, by principal city (or cities) served, and separated by political division, with opening and closing dates. It includes all such systems, past and present; cities with currently operating systems, and those systems themselves, are indicated in bold and blue background colored rows.  It is one in a group of lists that collectively cover all countries of the world; the other lists are indexed at List of town tramway systems.

This is not a list of streetcar operating companies. It is a list of U.S. cities that were the focus or base of a streetcar system at one time, with starting and ending dates for each general type of streetcar service (e.g. horsecar, electric streetcar) in each city or metropolitan area.  "System", as used in the article title, refers collectively to all streetcar infrastructure and rolling stock in a given metropolitan area, used by any of several different operating companies over many years, often passing from one operating company to the next. The "Name of system" column is intended to distinguish the few cases where two distinctly different systems were in operation in one city at the same time, but is also used to identify operators that have a Wikipedia article.  In many U.S. cities, the streetcar system was operated by a succession of different private companies during the years in which the system existed.

The use of the diamond (♦) symbol indicates where there were (or are) two or more independent streetcar (or light rail) systems operating concurrently within a single metropolitan area. Usually, this refers either to interurban lines connecting the area's principal city with other cities or to cases where separate cities within one metropolitan area were served by independently operated streetcar systems.

Unless otherwise noted in the "Type" column, all systems listed were/are conventional streetcar (tram) systems (although some past systems might have been termed light rail if that 1970s-introduced term had existed at the time they were in operation).  Interurban and light rail systems are noted in that column for convenience.

For lists of existing systems only, see the following:
 Light rail in the United States
 List of United States light rail systems by ridership
 Light rail in North America
 List of rail transit systems in the United States (which also includes subway/metro and commuter rail systems)

Alabama

 Peschkes (Part Four, 1998, page 26) states that a company was organized to build a steam tramway in Blountsville but never started construction, and that other sources tabulate this system among those in operation.

Arizona

Arkansas

California

Colorado

Peschkes (Part Four, 1998, Page 59) states that, despite various evidence, the following town did not have a tramway:

 Silver Cliff.

Connecticut

Delaware

District of Columbia

 Notes for Washington, D.C.:
 Operation into Maryland, ? – 2 January 1960.
 Operation into Virginia, 1923 – 25 August 1956.

Florida

Georgia

Peschkes (Part Four, 1998, Page 44) states that, despite the assumption of another historian, there is no evidence for tramways in the following towns:
Dahlonega
Dalton
LaGrange
Lexington
Summerville
Thomasville

Hawaii

Idaho

Illinois

Indiana

Iowa

Kansas

Peschkes (Part Four, 1998, Page 57) states that, although included in some statistics, the following (horse-drawn) streetcar systems were not built:
Beloit.
Dighton. Peschkes states that one source, dated 1888, states that this town had a streetcar line, but no confirmation was found.
El Dorado.
Marion. Peschkes states that "there is no more than a rumor" that this town had a horsecar line.

Kentucky

 Peschkes (Part Four, 1998, Page 59) states that, despite various evidence, the following towns did not have streetcar systems:
Barbourville – Peschkes describes "a marvellous picture postcard of a horse tramcar in the main street of Barbourville, with a woman driver," dated 1917. Similar picture postcards exist for U.S. towns that did not have horsecar or streetcar systems.
Mount Sterling.

Louisiana

Maine

Maryland

Massachusetts

Michigan

Minnesota

Mississippi

Missouri

Peschkes (Part Four, 1998, Page 80) states that, despite various evidence, the following towns did not have streetcar systems:
Excelsior Springs.
Lexington.

Montana

Nebraska

Nevada

New Hampshire

New Jersey

Note for Newark: The streetcar subway, the Newark City Subway, opened 26 May 1935. Also served East Orange and other neighboring towns. (See also Public Service Railway and Newark-Trenton Fast Line.) Last Newark streecar line not using the subway closed 1 May 1938. Last surface streetcar lines using the subway closed 30 Mar 1952. Since then, effectively operated as a "light rail" line; line extended in 2002. System expanded to include a second line in 2006.

New Mexico

New York

Note for Cortland – Homer – McGraw – Preble:  Horse tramway connected Cortland and Homer. Electric tramway, opened 1 Apr 1895, connected Cortland, Homer and McGraw. Extended to Preble in 1907. McGraw Preble segment closed 1 Apr 1929. Remainder closed 15 Feb 1931.
Note for Newburgh – Orange Lake – Walden: Opened in stages, to Orange Lake in July 1894, completed 1 Jun 1895. Newburgh – Orange Lake operated during summer season, 1924 and 1925, petrol (gasoline) traction (?).
Note for New York – City Island: Experimental monorail operated Bartow railway station – north end of City Island bridge, 15 Jul – 19 Jul 1910, and 14 Nov 1910 – 16 Mar 1914.
Note for New York – Rockaway Park: Tramcars operated over electrified Long Island Rail Road tracks between Far Rockaway and Hammels, 1905 – 9 Sep 1926, using overhead current collection to 1912 and third-rail current collection thereafter.

North Carolina

North Dakota

Ohio

Note for Dayton: Town streetcar services were provided by a single undertaking in most U.S. towns. Such undertakings were often organized by consolidation ("unification") of predecessor undertakings. In most cases, such consolidations were completed before the First World War. Dayton was a notable exception. In this town, five undertakings operated town streetcar services from 1909 to 1933. Conversions to trolleybus began in 1933; remarkably, all five undertakings operated trolleybuses for several months in 1940, before the beginning of consolidations.  See Trolleybuses in Dayton for further information.

Oklahoma

Oregon

Pennsylvania

Rhode Island

South Carolina

South Dakota

Tennessee

Texas

 Note: Peschkes (Part Four, 1998, Page 125) states that, although listed in some statistics, streetcar systems were not built in the following towns:
Brenham
Colorado City
Henrietta – Seymour
Marlin – Wootan Wells
Sulphur Springs

Utah

Vermont

Virginia

Washington

West Virginia

Wisconsin

Wyoming

See also

List of town tramway systems – parent article
List of town tramway systems in North America
Streetcars in North America
Light rail in the United States
List of United States light rail systems by ridership
List of tram and light rail transit systems
List of rail transit systems in the United States
List of metro systems
List of United States rapid transit systems by ridership
List of trolleybus systems in the United States

References

Bibliography
Books, Periodicals and External Links

 
United States
Tram
Streetcars in the United States